The 1931 Brisbane City Council election was held on 2 May 1931 to elect councillors for each of the 20 wards of the City of Brisbane. The election resulted in 8 seats for Labor, 7 seats for Civic Reform, 3 seats for non-party progressives and 2 seats for National Citizens. The new council elected John William Greene as Lord Mayor.

Results

References 

1931
1931 elections in Australia
1930s in Brisbane
May 1931 events